The 1978–80 Nordic Football Championship was the 12th Nordic Football Championship staged. Four Nordic countries participated: Denmark, Finland, Norway and Sweden. Denmark won the tournament, its second Nordic Championship win.

Results

1978

1979

1980

Table

Winners

Statistics

Goalscorers

See also
Balkan CupBaltic CupCentral European International CupMediterranean Cup

References

External links

1978-80
1978–79 in European football
1979–80 in European football
1978 in Swedish football
1979 in Swedish football
1980 in Swedish football
1978 in Danish football
1979 in Danish football
1980 in Danish football
1978 in Norwegian football
1979 in Norwegian football
1980 in Norwegian football
1978 in Finnish football
1979 in Finnish football
1980 in Finnish football